The Atchison County Library is a public library with three locations in Atchison County, Missouri.

The Central Library is located in Rock Port, Missouri, the Fairfax branch in Fairfax, Missouri and the Tarkio branch in Tarkio, Missouri.

Services
 Fax (Rock Port)
 Copy
 Scan to e-mail
 Public Access Computers
 Public WiFi
 Interlibrary Loan
Genealogy Room (Rock Port) - County newspapers on microfilm dating back to 1880, County history books, County cemetery books, plat maps, family histories, etc.
 Ancestry.com (basic)
 Accelerated Reading Program - search in our catalog
Services List

External links
 Website | http://acl.tlcdelivers.com/
 Libraries.org | https://librarytechnology.org/library/20262
 Missouri State Library Directory | https://s1.sos.mo.gov/library/molli/SearchDetails.aspx?id=20882

References

Atchison County, Missouri
Public libraries in Missouri